Oberon Zell-Ravenheart (born Timothy Zell, November 30, 1942, St. Louis, Missouri; formerly known as Otter G'Zell) is a Neopagan writer, speaker and religious leader. He is the co-founder of the Church of All Worlds.

Education
Zell earned a Bachelor of Arts degree in psychology from Westminster College in Fulton, Missouri, in 1965 before briefly enrolling in a doctoral program in clinical psychology at Washington University in St. Louis. He also received a Doctor of Divinity degree from Life Science College in Rolling Meadows, Illinois, (a defunct nonresidential seminary analogous to the Universal Life Church) in 1967. In 1968, he completed a teaching certificate at Harris–Stowe State University. His parents were Protestants.

Neopaganism
In an interview with Natalie Zaman in 2008, Zell described himself as a wizard. Distinguishing his practice from the wizards of fiction, Zell used the alternative spelling magick (with final "k") and claimed that his interest therein began at an early age with the reading of Greek myths and fairy tales.  As a child, Zell had visions, which his mother told him were derived from the life of his grandfather.
 
An early advocate of deep ecology, Zell-Ravenheart claims to have articulated the Gaia Hypothesis (using the spelling "Gaea") in 1970, independently of James Lovelock, who is usually given credit. Along with his wife Morning Glory and the other members of his group marriage, he has been influential in the modern polyamory movement.

Zell-Ravenheart co-founded the Ecosophical Research Association in 1977, an organization that explores the truth behind myths. This group was known for the "living unicorns" they created by minor surgery to the horn buds of goats, a technique he was granted a patent for in 1984. One of their unicorns, Lancelot, toured with the Ringling Bros. and Barnum & Bailey Circus.

Church of All Worlds
With R. Lance Christie, Zell-Ravenheart formed the Church of All Worlds (CAW) on April 7, 1962, by the ritual of "sharing water". This foundation ritual was practiced by a fictional church of the same name in Robert A. Heinlein's Stranger in a Strange Land. Zell-Ravenheart and Christie attributed their inspiration to Heinlein's novel. From the 1960s through the late 1990s, Zell-Ravenheart served as High Priest and Primate of the church. He returned to lead the Church of All Worlds, Inc. in 2005 and currently serves as First Primate.

Role in Neopagan community
A sculptor as well as an author, Zell has created numerous images of Pagan deities—some based upon historical images, others his original creations. With his family, he runs Mythic Images, a business through which his artwork is distributed.

Green Egg
As the creator and original editor of the Neopagan magazine Green Egg in 1968, Zell-Ravenheart was an early popularizer of the term "Neo-Pagan". When Green Egg began publishing as a spirit-duplicated newsletter, Zell used the term "Neo-Pagan" to describe the new religious movement he was helping to create. Green Egg later grew to be a semi-glossy magazine with international distribution and, in an era before the Internet, its letters column provided a widely distributed public forum for discussion and networking. Green Egg is currently published as an online magazine, edited by Rev. Alder Moonoak.

Grey School of Wizardry
He is a founder and the current Headmaster of the Grey School of Wizardry, an online school specializing in the teaching of a wide range of esoteric magic.

The Grey School incorporated on March 14, 2005 as a non-profit educational institution in the State of California. The school grew from lessons originally created by the Grey Council, a team of two dozen practitioners, who with Zell-Ravenheart, wrote the Grimoire for the Apprentice Wizard and later the Companion for the Apprentice Wizard. While initially conceived for ages 11–17, the school accepts adult students. The school comprises sixteen departments of study, various clubs and organizations, a forum area, a prefect/captain system, opportunities for awards and merits and a house/lodge system for adults and youths in which they can communicate directly with each other. Youth (under 18) students are sorted into four houses: Sylphs, Salamanders, Undines, and Gnomes. Adult (18+) students are sorted into four lodges: Society of the Four Winds, Order of the Dancing Flames, Coterie of the Flowing Waters, and Circle of the Standing Stones.

Speaker and teacher
Zell-Ravenheart regularly presents workshops, lectures, and ceremonies at Neopagan and New Age events, as well as at science fiction conventions and renaissance fairs. He and his late wife Morning Glory have appeared at more than 20 Starwood Festivals and WinterStar Symposiums over a quarter century, and maintained a Church of All Worlds presence at Starwood, called the CAWmunity, for over a decade.

Oberon and Morning Glory Zell-Ravenheart lived in Sonoma County, California, where they were members of the Sonoma County Pagan Network. He is a frequent speaker at the organization's local activities, and has contributed articles to its website.

Health
During a routine colonoscopy, doctors found a cancerous growth attached to Zell's colon, and removed it laparoscopically at Petaluma Valley Hospital. Following surgery, he underwent a six-month course of chemotherapy and has continued a reduced schedule of travel and teaching. Another surgery repaired a hernia at the cancer surgery incision in August 2009, but was otherwise not cancer-related. Zell regards himself as cured of the cancer. He resided in Sonoma County, California, with Morning Glory until her death at age 65 from multiple myeloma on May 13, 2014.

Bibliography
 The Rites of Summer by Gwydion Pendderwen, Nemeton (1980) (art only) 
 Grimoire for the Apprentice Wizard.
 Dragonlore: From the Archives of the Grey School of Wizardry. Dekirk, Ash "Leoparddancer", with Oberon Zell-Ravenheart.
 Gargoyles: From the Archives of the Grey School of Wizardry. Pesznecker, Susan "Moonwriter", with Oberon Zell-Ravenheart.
 A Wizard's Bestiary. Dekirk, Ash "Leoparddancer", with Oberon Zell-Ravenheart.

Discography
 The Church of All Worlds - Lecture on cassette ACE
 Men and the Goddess - Lecture (on cassette) ACE
 A Bouquet of Lovers - Lecture with Morning Glory Zell-Ravenheart (on CD and cassette) ACE
 Living Your Own Myth - Lecture with Morning Glory Zell-Ravenheart (on cassette) ACE

Media appearances
Oberon Zell-Ravenheart has been interviewed on many television and radio shows in the United States, England, and Australia.  Some of these include:

Television

 The Sunday Show (Australia)
 Channel 4(England)
 Strange Universe
 A&E
 The Marilyn Kagan Show
 Faith Under Fire with Lee Strobel
 Counter-Culture Hour
 The Witching Hour
 "The Devil's Advocate with Charles Ashman", KPLR-TV (1974)
 Soapbox, KPLR-TV (1973)

Radio

 “Brother Wease” WCMF-FM
 “Dave Wilson” WIBC-AM
 “Exploring Unknown Phenomena” KZUM 89.3-FM
 “Clear Reception” WTMD-FM (NPR)
 “Allan & Rebecca” WQAL-FM
 “Larry & Sheryl” ALQ
 “Jack Roberts” Cable Radio Network
 “Louie Free” WWOW
 “Bulldog’s Morning Show” PJD5-FM
 "96 Rock Mornings with Salt and Demetri the Greek" (July 24, 2007)
 "Coast to Coast AM" (January 13, 2008) and (March 21, 2012)

"For your health"

References

Further reading

 Aloi, Peg. The Oberon Interview Obsidian Magazine, Issue 1.
 Bond, Lawrence & Ellen Evert Hopman (1996) People of the Earth:  The New Pagans Speak Out (reissued as Being a Pagan: Druids, Wiccans & Witches Today in 2002 Destiny Books) Interview.
 Vale, V. and John Sulak (2001). Modern Pagans. San Francisco: Re/Search Publications;

External links

Articles and interviews
 
 Online Wizardry Recognized with a 501(c)(3)  Alternative Approaches article
 Interview With a Living Pagan Icon The Goddess interview by Mabyn Wind
 10 Questions with Oberon Zell-Ravenheart The Magical Buffet

Other links
 Official Website
 Oberon Zell Ravenheart Biography (Church of All Worlds)
 Grey School of Wizardry
 Green Egg Magazine - Legendary Journal of the Awakening Earth
 "Defining paganism". Isaac Bonewits (2007).
 Mythic Images Website at Guiding Treee
 Interview with Oberon Zell-Ravenheart 

1942 births
American naturists
American modern pagans
American occult writers
Harris–Stowe State University alumni
Living people
People from Sonoma County, California
Washington University in St. Louis alumni
Westminster College (Missouri) alumni
Writers from California
Writers from St. Louis
Modern pagan writers
Founders of modern pagan movements
Polyamorous people